Vuhlehirsk (Uglegorsk) is a city in Horlivka Raion, Donetsk Oblast (province) of Ukraine. Vuhlehirsk had a population of 8,226 in 2011; more recently, its population was estimated to be .

Vuhlehirsk is a district-level city in the Donetsk region, subordinated to the Yenakiieve city council. Vuhlehirsk is located in the south-eastern part of Ukraine at the distance of 61 km from the regional centre of Donetsk and 750 km from the capital of Ukraine, Kyiv. Its official date of foundation is 1879 – the year of the opening of the Khatsepetivka railway station (Vuhlehirsk was called Khatsepetivka village until 1958). 

On 11 December 2014, the city municipality of Vuhlehirsk, including the city of Vuhlehirsk, five other settlements (Bulavyne, Hrozne, Kayutyne, Krasny Pakhar, Savelivka), and two town municipalities (Olkhovatske and Bulavynske), were transferred from Yenakiieve Municipality to Bakhmut Raion.

In February 2015, during the War in Donbas, the city was captured by separatist forces of the self-declared Donetsk People's Republic during the Battle of Debaltseve.

Vuhlehirsk formerly had a tram and trolleybus system. Its tramway system operated from November 10, 1958 to June 28, 1980 and was serviced by KTM/KTP-1 trams and a few KTM/KTP-2 trams. Its trolleybus network operated from July 8, 1982 to August 12, 2014. The contact network was destroyed by the War in Donbas, a year after the successful addition of another trolleybus on the route, for a maximum of two vehicles during the peak.

Demographics
The city's population was 10,309 in 2001. 

Native language as of the Ukrainian Census of 2001:
Russian 58.9%
Ukrainian 40.1%
Belarusian 0.5%

References

Cities in Donetsk Oblast
Cities of district significance in Ukraine
Populated places established in the Russian Empire
Horlivka Raion